WMJR (1380 AM) is a radio station broadcasting a Catholic format as an affiliate of Relevant Radio. Licensed to Nicholasville, Kentucky, United States, the station serves the Lexington area. The station is owned by Relevant Radio, Inc.

History
The station went on the air as WHRS on December 26, 1985. On August 1, 1994, the station changed its call sign to WLNT, on January 19, 1996, to WINH, and on August 5, 1997, to the current WMJR.

Translator
WMJR has an FM translator in Lexington on 94.9 MHz. Its call letters are W235AK. This FM translator station was put into place to allow the broadcast of WMJR to be heard throughout metropolitan Lexington at night, as the AM signal is greatly deteriorated at night. Additionally, the sound quality of WMJR broadcasts is much greater on the FM translator than on the AM frequency. Individuals who may prefer the FM band over the AM band now have a way to listen to WMJR without leaving the FM band.

Logos

References

External links

MJR
Relevant Radio stations
Radio stations established in 1985
1985 establishments in Kentucky
Nicholasville, Kentucky